Remote is the third extended play (EP) by American band Wallows. It was released on October 23, 2020 through Atlantic Records. A deluxe version was released on February 19, 2021.

Background
On September 9, 2020, Wallows released the EP's first single "Nobody Gets Me (Like You)". On October 2, 2020, the EP's second single "Virtual Aerobics" was released. A music video was released alongside each single the same day. On October 28, 2020, an animated music video for "Wish Me Luck" was released. On February 15, 2021, "Quarterback" was released as the third single and first off the deluxe edition of Remote.

Track listing
Track listing adapted from the Apple Music. All songs produced by Wallows, John DeBold, and Sachi DeSarafino, except where noted.

Note
  indicates an additional producer
  indicates a vocal producer

Personnel
Credits adapted from Tidal.

Wallows
 Dylan Minnette – vocals , claps , acoustic guitar , synthesizer , engineer 
 Braeden Lemasters – piano , vocals , claps , guitar , synthesizer , electric guitar , bass guitar , engineer 
 Cole Preston – acoustic guitar , bass guitar , drum programming , drums , electric guitar , synthesizer , claps , guitar , additional programming , keyboards  engineer 

Additional musicians

 John DeBold – acoustic guitar , bass guitar , drum programming , electric guitar , claps , synthesizer 
 Sachi DiSarafino – acoustic guitar , ad lib vocals , drum programming , piano , programming , synthesizer , claps , guitar , vocals , additional vocals , bass guitar 
 Ben Lumsdaine – samples 
 Albert Hammond Jr. – outro vocals 
	Ariel Rechtshaid – autoharp, drum programming, synthesizer 
	Jared Solomon – banjo, bass synthesizer, drums, glockenspiel, guitar, keyboards, percussion, vocals 
	Remi Wolf – percussion, vocals 

Technical

 Emily Lazar – masterer 
 Caleb Laven – mixer 
 Nathan Phillips – mixer, masterer 
 Manny Marroquin – mixer 
 Chris Galland – mixing engineer 
 John DeBold – engineer 
 Sachi DiSarafino –engineer , additional engineer 
 Matt DiMona – engineer 
 Rob Cohen – engineer 
 Chris Allgood – assistant masterer 
 Michael Fridmann – assistant mix engineer 
 Scott Desmarais– assistant mix engineer 
 Jeremie Inhaber – assistant mix engineer 
 Robin Florent – assistant mix engineer  
 Joe LaPorta – assistant mix engineer

Charts

References

2020 EPs
Wallows albums
Atlantic Records EPs